The 2001 European Nations Cup (ENC) Third Division (a European rugby union competition for national teams)  was contested over a one-year period by 15 teams divided in three pools.

The teams were divided in 3 pool according to the results of the first round of 2003 Rugby World Cup – European qualification, played the previous season

Pool 1 (Title)
Played by :
  (3rd) im RWC qualification pool A
  (2nd) in RWC qualification pool B
  (3rd) in RWC qualification pool B
  (2nd) in RWC qualification pool C
  (3rd) in RWC qualification pool C

table 

  Promoted to 2002–03 2nd div.- Pool B
  Relegated to 2002–03 3rd div.- Pool B

Result 

 Moldova-Andorra not played.

Pool 2 (Plate) 
Played by:
  (4th) im RWC qualification pool A
  (5th) in RWC qualification pool A
  (4th) in RWC qualification pool B
  (5th) in RWC qualification pool B
  (4th) in RWC qualification pool C

table 

  Promoted to 2002–03 3rd div.- Pool A
  Telegated to 2002–03 3rd div.- Pool C

Results

Pool 3 (Bowl) 
Played by:
  (6th) im RWC qualification pool A
  (6th) in RWC qualification pool A
  (5th) in RWC qualification pool C
  (6th) in RWC qualification pool C

table 

  Promoted to 2002–03 3rd div.- Pool B

results

Bibliography

See also
 2001-2002 European Nations Cup First Division
 2003 Rugby World Cup – European qualification

2001–02
2001–02 in European rugby union